Figline Vegliaturo is a town and comune in the province of Cosenza in the Calabria region of southern Italy.

It is the birthplace of singer Rocco Granata.

References

Cities and towns in Calabria